The Gilkey Memorial is a memorial and tomb for those who have died while climbing K2. The memorial is named after Art Gilkey who died on the mountain in 1953.

The memorial is a stone cairn covered with metal plaques. Each plaque is inscribed with the details about the dead climber like when they went missing or were found dead.

In 2002 when his remains were found, a plaque was added for Dudley Wolfe, the American climber who had died on the mountain during the 1939 American expedition.

References

K2
Monuments and memorials in Pakistan